Tall Poppy Syndrome is the debut studio album by Norwegian progressive metal band Leprous. It was recorded and mixed at Black Lounge Studio/The Abyss by Jonas Kjellgren, mastered at West West Side by Alan Douches. Art Design by Ritxi Ostariz.

Track listing

Personnel 
 Einar Solberg – lead vocals, keyboards
 Tor Oddmund Suhrke – guitars, vocals
 Øystein Landsverk – guitars, vocals
 Halvor Strand – bass guitar
 Tobias Ørnes Andersen – drums

References 

2009 debut albums
Leprous albums